Qalin Qayah (also Romanized as Qālīn Qayah, and Qālīn Qayeh; also known as Hārūn Qal‘eh and Kalangaya) is a village in Zarjabad Rural District, Firuz District, Kowsar County, Ardabil Province, Iran. At the 2006 census, its population was 139, in 30 families.

References 

Tageo

Towns and villages in Kowsar County